Wolf Creek is a stream in Taney County, Missouri. The headwaters are in the Mark Twain National Forest on the southwest flank of Lime Kiln Mountain. The stream flows northwest and enters Bull Shoals Lake adjacent to Cedar Creek.

A variant name was "Wolfs Branch". The creek has the name of the local Wolf family.

See also
List of rivers of Missouri

References

Rivers of Taney County, Missouri
Rivers of Missouri